Ralph Hastings may refer to:

Ralph Hastings (died 1346)
Sir Ralph Hastings (died 1495)
Ralph Hastings, character in Follow Me, Boys!
Ralph Hastings of Kirby and Burton Hastings, MP for Yorkshire (UK Parliament constituency)